Nothin' Leica Dane was a notable Australian bred Thoroughbred racehorse who won the 1995 Victoria Derby and three days later finished second in the Melbourne Cup as a three-year-old.

He also sired the winners of over $16 million in prizemoney with his best offspring headed by Group I winners Hot Danish (All Aged Stakes, Doomben 10,000) and Cinque Cento (Doomben Cup). 

Nothin' Leica Dane died in 2018, aged 26 years.

References

1992 racehorse births
2018 racehorse deaths
Victoria Derby winners
Racehorses bred in Australia
Racehorses trained in Australia
Thoroughbred family 8-k